John F. Murphy may refer to:
 John F. Murphy (law professor) (born 1937), law professor who has written on counter-terrorism and the Guantanamo military commissions
 John F. Murphy (JAG), naval officer appointed as the fifth Chief Prosecutor of the Guantanamo military commissions
 John F. Murphy Sr. (1923–2011), American politician from Vermont
 John F. Murphy (South Dakota politician) (1930–2003), American lawyer and politician from South Dakota
 John Frank Murphy (born 1977), American federal judge

See also
John Murphy (disambiguation)